This is a list of governors of Eastern Region, Nigeria. Eastern Region was one of Nigeria's federal divisions, dating back originally from the division of the colony Southern Nigeria in 1954.  The region was divided in 1967 into three new states, East-Central State, Rivers State and South-Eastern State.

See also
Nigeria
States of Nigeria
List of state governors of Nigeria

References

Eastern Region